SN 1999ec was a type Ib supernova that was discovered in the interacting galaxy NGC 2207 on October 2, 1999. It was found on images taken with the Katzman Automatic Imaging Telescope at the Lick Observatory. The progenitor is estimated to have had 38 times the mass of the Sun and was 5.34 million years old at the time of the outburst.

References

External links
 Spectra on the Open Supernova Catalog
 Simbad

Canis Major
Supernovae